Frog cloning may refer to:
 Ataxx, a computer-based board game
 the cloning of tadpoles in biology